USS Surf may refer to:

, a United States Navy minesweeper in commission from 1917 to 1919
, a civilian yacht made available to the United States Navy in 1917 for use as a patrol vessel but never commissioned

United States Navy ship names